The International Civil Rights Walk of Fame, is a historic promenade that honors activists involved in the Civil Rights Movement and other national and global civil rights activists.  It was created in 2004, and is located at the Martin Luther King Jr. National Historic Site in Atlanta. The site is more than just a promenade; it is an outdoor exhibit that showcases, in granite and bronze, the footstep impressions of those honored. 

According to the National Park Service, which runs the historic site, the Walk of Fame was created "to give recognition to those courageous soldiers of justice who sacrificed and struggled to make equality a reality for all." The Walk of Fame has enriched historic value and cultural heritage to the area it is located, priming it into a tourist attraction.

The Walk of Fame is a product of Xernona Clayton, an American civil rights activist and executive broadcaster. In the National Historic Site location the Walk of Fame gets around 800,000 visitors a year.

Beginning in 2012, inductions will be held every two years.

In 2019 it was announced that the Walk of Fame would be partially relocating to the National Center for Civil and Human Rights in downtown Atlanta.

List of inductees

2004
 Ralph David Abernathy, Sr., civil rights leader who had a close and enduring partnership with Dr. King
 Juanita J. Abernathy, civil rights activist
 Ivan Allen, Jr., former mayor of Atlanta during the turbulent civil rights era of the 1960s
 Julian Bond, civil rights leader
 Jimmy Carter, 39th President of the United States
 Medgar Evers, civil rights activist
 Dorothy Height, educator, social activist
 Jesse L. Jackson, Sr., minister, civil rights activist
 Judge Frank M. Johnson, United States Federal judge
 Lyndon Baines Johnson, 36th President of the United States
 John Lewis, politician, civil rights leader
 Joseph E. Lowery, minister, civil rights leader
 Evelyn G. Lowery, civil rights leader
 Thurgood Marshall, former US Supreme Court Justice (1969–1991)
 Rosa Parks, civil rights activist
 Hosea Williams, civil rights leader
 Andrew Young, civil rights activist, former mayor of Atlanta

2005
 Henry Aaron, baseball player, social activist
 Harry Belafonte, musician, actor, social activist
 John Conyers, Jr., politician, social activist
 Dick Gregory, comedian, social activist
 Maynard H. Jackson, former mayor of Atlanta
 Ralph E. McGill, journalist, social activist
 Fred L. Shuttlesworth, social activist
 Ted Turner, media mogul and philanthropist
 Judge Elbert P. Tuttle, former chief judge of the US Court of Appeals (1960–1967)
 Nancy Wilson, singer, social activist
 Reverend Addie L. Wyatt, Labor leader, civil rights pioneer, pastor

2006
 Reverend Joseph E. Boone, social activist
 Reverend William Holmes Borders, Sr.
 Xernona Clayton, civil rights leader, broadcasting executive
 Lena Horne, singer, actress, social activist
 John E. Jacob, former president and CEO of the National Urban League
 Reverend James Orange, pastor, civil rights activist
 Bernard Parks, politician, social activist
 Archbishop Desmond Tutu, South African cleric, social activist
 William Clinton, 42nd President of the United States
 Stevie Wonder, singer, civil rights activist

2007
 Lerone Bennett, Jr., scholar, author, historian, social activist
 Tony Bennett, singer, social activist
 Marian Wright Edelman, social activist for the rights of children
 Shirley Franklin, 58th mayor of Atlanta
 Frankie Muse Freeman, civil rights attorney
 Joe Louis, boxer, social activist
 Sir Lynden Pindling, former Premier of the Colony of the Bahama Island (1967–1973)
 Sidney Poitier, actor, social activist
 Dr. Otis W. Smith, physician
 Maxine Waters, politician, social activist
 L. Douglas Wilder, former governor of Virginia
 Jean Childs Young, civil rights activist and educator

2008
 Dr. Maya Angelou, poet, memoirist, actress
 Senator Edward W. Brooke, social activist, politician
 Tyrone L. Brooks, Sr., social activist, politician
 Sammy Davis Jr., singer, dancer
 Jesse Hill, business executive
 Dr. Benjamin Hooks, established Benjamin L. Hooks Institute for Social Change
 Clarence B. Jones, Martin Luther King's attorney
 Tom Joyner, radio host
 The Right Honorable Prime Minister Michael Manley, former Prime Minister of Jamaica
 Herman J. Russell, founder and CEO of H. J. Russell and Company
 Dr. Wyatt Tee Walker, executive director of the SCLC 1960-1964

2009
 Rev. Dr. C. M. Alexander
 Danny J. Bakewell, Sr., entrepreneur
 Dr. Erieka Bennett
 Roberto Goizueta, CEO of Coca-Cola
 Cathy Hughes, entrepreneur, radio and television personality, and business executive
 Earvin "Magic" Johnson, basketball great and businessman
 The Links, Incorporated, nonprofit organization of professional African-American women
 Sam Massell, businessman and mayor of Atlanta
 Ernest N. Morial, mayor of New Orleans
 Father Michael L. Pfleger, Roman Catholic priest and social activist
 Rev. Al Sharpton, social justice agitator and media figure
 Congressman William L. Clay, Sr., long-serving member of US House of Representatives from Missouri
 Rev. C. T. Vivian, minister and Martin Luther King associate

2010
 Congressman James E. Clyburn
 Judge Damon J. Keith
 Rev. Samuel Billy Kyles
 National Newspaper Publishers Association
 Eugene C. Patterson
 Albert Sampson
 Rita Jackson Samuels
 Congresswoman Diane E. Watson

2011
 Arthur Blank
 James Brown
 Rev. Dr. Gerald Durley
 Bishop Neil C. Ellis
 Leon Hall
 Bishop Barbara King
 Marc H. Morial
 Mayor Carl Stokes
 Congressman Louis Stokes
 Henry "Hank" Thomas

2012
 Rev. Willie Bolden
 J.T. Johnson and the Civil Rights Foot Soldiers
 Rev. Dr. E. T. Caviness
 Dosan Ahn Chang-ho
 Constance W. Curry
 Fred D. Gray
 Rev. Theodore M. Hesburgh
 Charles J. Ogletree
 Dr. Walter F. Young

2014
 Bishop John Hurst Adams
 Governor Roy Barnes
 John Carlos
 Tommie Smith
 Perry Gladstone Christie, Prime Minister of the Bahamas
 Dr. Norman C. Frances
 Harry E. Johnson
 Representative Calvin Smyre
 Thomas N. Todd
 Rev. Jasper W. Williams, Jr.

2016
 Dr. Amelia Boynton Robinson, civil rights activist from the Selma movement
 Rev. Dr. Jamal-Harrison Bryant, pastor, philanthropist, author, motivational speaker
 Rev. Dr. Frederick D. Haynes III, pastor,  community activist
 Rev. Dr. Jim Holley, Historic Little Rock Missionary Baptist Church pastor, "ministry of liberation"
 Gordon L. Joyner, influential Atlanta lawyer
 Rev. Dr. Raphael Gamaliel Warnock, pastor, defender of civil and human rights

2018
 Jan Prisby Bryson, business executive
 Thomas W. Dortch Jr., national chair of 100 Black Men of America
 Monica Kaufman Pearson, broadcast journalist
 Sir Franklyn R. Wilson, Bahamian businessman

See also
 List of civil rights leaders

References

External links
International Civil Rights Walk of Fame

Walks of fame
Halls of fame in Georgia (U.S. state)
Civil liberties in the United States
African-American history of Georgia (U.S. state)
Civil rights movement museums
Old Fourth Ward
Martin Luther King Jr. National Historic Site and Preservation District